"Leaders of the Free World" is Elbow's second and last single from the album Leaders of the Free World. It is also Elbow's last single released through V2 Records.

Track listing
CD1:
"Leaders of the Free World"
"The Long War Shuffle"

CD2 (Maxi-CD single):
"Leaders of the Free World" – 6:11
"Mexican Standoff" (Spanish Version) – 3:53
"The Drunken Engineer" – 2:12
"Leaders of the Free World" (Video) – 4:13

7" vinyl:
"Leaders of the Free World"
"Gentle As"

Charts

References

2005 singles
Elbow (band) songs
Songs written by Guy Garvey
V2 Records singles
2005 songs